is a masculine Japanese given name.

Possible writings
The name Takashi can have multiple different meanings depending on which kanji is used to write it. Some possible writings of the name include:
隆 - "prosperous noble"
喬士 - "high, boasting, samurai, gentleman"
崇史 - "adore, revere, chronicler, history"
孝 - "filial piety, serve parents"
貴志
敬
Takashi can also be written in hiragana and/or katakana:
タカシ (katakana)
たかし (hiragana)

People with the name
Takashi Abe (阿部 隆, born 1967), Japanese shogi player
, Japanese rugby union player
Takashi Amano (天野 尚, 1954–2015), Japanese photographer, aquarist and designer
Takashi Aonishi (青西 高嗣), Japanese music artist
Takashi Asahina (朝比奈 隆, 1908–2001), Japanese conductor
, Japanese volleyball player
Takashi Fujii (藤井 隆, born 1972), Japanese singer and comedian
Takashi Hagino (萩野 崇, born 1973), Japanese actor
Takashi Hara (原 敬, 1856–1921), Japanese politician and Prime Minister of Japan
Takashi Hara (artist) (ハラタカシ, born 1983), Japanese contemporary artist
Takashi Hasegawa, Japanese electrical engineer and programmer
Takashi Hashiguchi (橋口 たかし, born 1967), Japanese manga artist
Takashi Hikino (曳野 孝), Japanese economist and educator
, Japanese poet and critic
Takashi Hirose (広瀬 隆, born 1943), Japanese writer
Takashi "Halo" Hirose (died 2002), American swimmer
Takashi "Taka" Hirose (born 1967), Japanese musician and chef
Takashi Iizuka (game designer) (飯塚 隆, born 1970), Japanese video game director and designer
, Japanese shogi player
, Japanese handball player
, Japanese actor
, Japanese public relations practitioner, scholar and theorist
, Japanese literature academic
Takashi Ishii (film director) (石井 隆, born 1946), Japanese film director, screenwriter and manga artist
Takashi Ishii (baseball) (石井 貴, born 1971), Japanese baseball pitcher and coach
Takashi Ishimoto (石本 隆, 1935–2009), a Japanese swimmer
, Japanese kickboxer
, Japanese basketball player
, Japanese ice hockey player
, Japanese shogi player
, Japanese handball player
Takashi Kawamura (politician) (河村 たかし, born 1948), Japanese politician
, Japanese footballer
Takashi Kimura (disambiguation), multiple people
Takashi Koizumi (小泉 堯史, born 1955), Japanese film director
, Japanese boxer
, Japanese volleyball player
, Japanese industrialist, investor, and art collector
, Japanese computer scientist
, Japanese basketball player
, Japanese cross-country skier
Takashi Matsumoto (disambiguation), multiple people
Takashi Matsunaga (松永 貴志, born 1986), Japanese jazz pianist
Takashi Matsuoka, Japanese-American writer
Takashi Miike (三池 崇史, born 1960), Japanese filmmaker
, Japanese footballer
, Japanese footballer and manager
Takashi Murakami (村上 隆, born 1962), Japanese contemporary artist
, Japanese rower
Takashi Nagai (永井 隆, 1908–1951), Japanese physician and survivor of the Nagasaki bombing
Takashi Nagasaki (長崎 尚志, born 1954), Japanese author, manga writer and former editor of manga
Takashi Nagasako (長嶝 高士, born 1964), Japanese voice actor
Takashi Nagatsuka (長塚 節, 1879–1915), Japanese novelist and poet
, Japanese politician
, Japanese mixed martial artist
Takashi Nakamura (中村 たかし, born 1995), Japanese animator, and anime director
Takashi Narita (成田 貴志, born 1969), Japanese former volleyball player
Takashi Niigaki (新垣 隆, born 1970), Japanese music teacher
Takashi Okamura (disambiguation), multiple people
Takashi Ono (小野 喬, born 1931), Japanese gymnast
, Japanese voice actor
Takashi Ozaki (尾崎 隆, 1952–2011), Japanese mountaineer
Takashi Saito (斎藤 隆, born 1970), Japanese baseball player
, Japanese footballer
Takashi Saito (c. 1990 - 2007), sumo wrestler who died due to injuries sustained in the Tokitsukaze stable hazing scandal
Takashi Sakai (酒井 隆, 1887–1946), Japanese general
Takashi Shimizu (清水 崇, born 1972), Japanese filmmaker
, Japanese footballer
Takashi Shimura (志村 喬, 1905–1982), Japanese actor
Takashi Sorimachi (反町 隆史, born 1973), Japanese singer and actor
, Japanese sailor
, Japanese ice hockey player
, Japanese baseball player
Takashi Umeda (梅田 高志, born 1976), Japanese footballer
, Japanese footballer
, Japanese anime director
, Japanese architect
, Japanese actor
Takashi Yanase, author of the picture book series Anpanman
, Japanese racing driver
, Japanese swimmer
, Japanese water polo player
, better known as Cyber Kong, Japanese professional wrestler
, Japanese comedian
Takashi Yoshimatsu (吉松 隆, born 1953), Japanese composer
Takashi Yuasa (湯浅 卓, born 1955), Japanese lawyer
, Mongolian sumo wrestler

Fictional characters
 a character from Pita Ten
Takashi Hayase, a character from The Super Dimension Fortress Macross
, a character from The Prince of Tennis
, a character from Highschool of the Dead
Takashi Kurosawa, a character from The Hitman's Bodyguard
 (Mori), a character from Ouran High School Host Club
, the title character from Natsume's Book of Friends
, a character from Cyber Team in Akihabara
Takashi 'Shiro' Shirogane, a character from Voltron: Legendary Defender
Takashi Sone, a character from Haru yo, Koi
, a character from Yotsuba&!
, a character from Cardcaptor Sakura
Takashi Kovacs, a character from Altered Carbon
Takashi Mitsuya, a character from Tokyo Revengers
Takashi Todoroki, a character from Yu-Gi-Oh! Zexal
Takashi, a supporting character who goes by the mutant name Tiger Claw in Teenage Mutant Ninja Turtles

References

Japanese masculine given names

pt:Takashi